Edward Goodwin Burnham (June 2, 1827 - before May 5, 1908), was the president of Eaton, Cole Cole & Burnham Company. He was a member of the Connecticut State Senate 14th District from 1887 to 1888.

Biography
He was born in Springfield, Massachusetts on June 2, 1827. He died before May 5, 1908.

References

1827 births
1908 deaths
Politicians from Springfield, Massachusetts
Connecticut state senators
Businesspeople from Springfield, Massachusetts
19th-century American politicians
19th-century American businesspeople